Calamotropha paludella is a species of moth of the family Crambidae. It is found in Europe, Africa, Australia and large parts of Asia.

The wingspan is 23–29 mm. The moth flies from June to August depending on the location.

The larvae feed on bulrush (Typha latifolia) and sometimes lesser bulrush (Typha angustifolia).

External links
 waarneming.nl 
 Lepidoptera of Belgium
 Calamotropha paludella at UKmoths

Crambinae
Moths described in 1824
Moths of Africa
Moths of Asia
Moths of Australia
Moths of Europe
Taxa named by Jacob Hübner